The  is a geographical area that is located in the Rokko Mountains, Hyōgo, Japan. This valley is a part of Setonaikai National Park in Japan.

History
The name of Kamakura Valley originated from a historical anecdote: In the 13th century, Hōjō Tokiyori, the Shikken, or regent, for the shōgun, visited this valley and praised the beauty.

Geography

This valley is along the Funazaka River, which is a branch of the Muko River. The length of the valley is about two kilometers. This valley was made by the river, which eroded the liparite stone, resulting the tall cliff faces along the river. This valley has the famous Hyakujo Rock, which is a land mark and a popular climbing spot.

Route
 Dōjō Station of Fukuchiyama Line

Gallery

References
 Official Home Page of the Geographical Survey Institute in Japan
 Rokkosan, Yama to Keikosha, 2007

Tourist attractions in Hyōgo Prefecture
Landforms of Hyōgo Prefecture
Valleys of Japan